The Match is a series of exhibition match play golf challenge matches that began in 2018. The event features major professional golfers or other notable athletes facing each other in a head-to-head competition. The format has varied throughout the run of the event, with three of the five entries featuring a best ball format where the professional golfers are paired with a professional American football quarterback or, in one case, a basketball player. In all of the events, sports entertainment elements were included, particularly with the inclusion of sports betting elements in that the contestants wager portions of their prize on side bets during the contest. Turner Sports has televised all five iterations of the event. Since 2020, two iterations of The Match have been held each year, one in the spring and the other on Thanksgiving weekend.

Background
Jack Whigham, a Hollywood agent, and Bryan Zuriff, a film and TV producer, conceived the event. Zuriff was a fan of The Skins Game—a former PGA Tour unofficial event that was held around Thanksgiving weekend—and envisioned a concept for a golf event that would, as explained by Whigham, be "played the way a lot of us play with our buddies on the weekends? You know, where you bet on everything and talk smack and basically have this continually running dialogue of giving each other" grief.

Mark Steinberg, an agent who represented Tiger Woods (who competed in the first two events), contrasted the event with Monday Night Golf—a series of primetime, network television events largely intended to be a vehicle for Woods at the height of his popularity—stating that it would feature both sports and entertainment elements and not be focused purely on competitive aspects. The event would be jointly-owned by Woods and Phil Mickelson (an associate of Zuriff's and a competitor in the first four entries), but the entity still had to pay a rights fee to the PGA Tour—which would impose some restrictions and conditions on the presentation and format of the event.

Event details

Tiger vs. Phil

The first edition, titled The Match: Tiger vs. Phil, was played on November 23, 2018, between Tiger Woods and Phil Mickelson, at the Shadow Creek Golf Course in North Las Vegas, Nevada. The purse for the event was $9 million, with the winner taking the entire amount. Mickelson won the match after 22 holes, including four playoff holes. The event was marketed as a pay per view by Turner Sports via Bleacher Report Live, but technical issues with the over-the-top distribution of the PPV forced the event to instead be streamed for free; Turner and other providers subsequently offered refunds.

Champions for Charity
A rematch, The Match: Champions for Charity, was played on May 24, 2020, at Medalist Golf Club in Hobe Sound, Florida. It featured a pro-am four-ball format with each golfer having a National Football League  quarterback as his partner: Woods was paired with two-time Super Bowl champion Peyton Manning, and Mickelson with then six-time Super Bowl champion quarterback Tom Brady. Woods and Manning held off a late comeback from Mickelson and Brady to win by a single hole.

The match was broadcast live on TNT, TBS, HLN and truTV, drawing an average 2.8 million viewers. Brian Anderson was the host of the event, Trevor Immelman and Charles Barkley served as analysts, and Justin Thomas and Amanda Balionis were on-course reporters.

Champions for Change
A third edition, titled The Match: Champions For Change, took place on November 27, 2020, at Stone Canyon Golf Club in Oro Valley, Arizona. The match, benefitting historically black colleges and universities, was played using an American foursomes format. Mickelson partnered NBA hall-of-famer Charles Barkley, who played from a forward set of tees, to defeat Manning and NBA star Stephen Curry, 4 and 3.

The event was broadcast live on TNT, earning an average 1.0 million viewers. Anderson and Immelman returned as host and analyst, respectively, alongside NBA star Andre Iguodala, who was also an analyst. Gary McCord and Cheyenne Woods served as on-course reporters. Additionally, a "Cart Cam" stream was made available for the event exclusively through Bleacher Report with host Taylor Rooks and on-course correspondent Eli Manning.

The Match IV
A fourth edition of The Match took place on July 6, 2021. Mickelson and Brady competed against Green Bay Packers quarterback Aaron Rodgers and professional golfer Bryson DeChambeau at The Reserve at Moonlight Basin in Big Sky, Montana. There was a slight change to the format, with greensomes replacing the American foursomes format used in the previous edition. DeChambeau and Rodgers won the match 3 and 2.

The fourth iteration of The Match was broadcast live on TNT, TBS, and truTV on July 6, 2021. Anderson, Barkley, and Immelman all returned as host and analysts, respectively, alongside NFL star Larry Fitzgerald, who made his debut on The Match an analyst. Cheyenne Woods returned as on-course reporter. Kevin Frazier of Entertainment Tonight also made his debut on The Match as the pre-match host, alongside Barkley, Fitzgerald, and Immelman.

Bryson vs. Brooks
A fifth edition took place between DeChambeau and Brooks Koepka on November 26, 2021, at Wynn Golf Club in Las Vegas. The match was a result of an ongoing "feud" between the two players. The format for the fifth version of the match returned to the original format of Tiger vs. Phil, with the length of the match reduced to 12 holes. It was again broadcast across the outlets of Turner Sports, averaging 1.2 million viewers.

Neither player had ideal preparation for the match, with Koepka missing the cut in his previous two tournaments and DeChambeau having played no tournament golf for two months. Koepka won four of the first eight holes, and claimed victory when DeChambeau failed to make his birdie putt on the ninth green and conceded. The players continued to play the next two holes, where DeChambeau won the longest drive and nearest the pin spot prizes for charity.

The Match VI
The sixth edition of The Match was announced April 18, 2022 to be held on June 1, with a roster consisting entirely of American football quarterbacks: Brady and Rodgers were paired against Josh Allen and Patrick Mahomes. It used a shamble format. Brady and Rodgers defeated Allen and Mahomes by one hole; the contest came down to the final putt, with Rodgers sinking the winning putt and Allen narrowly missing a long birdie putt that would have sent the match to a playoff.

This was the first edition of The Match to be distributed internationally via Eurosport, GolfTV, and Discovery+, following the merger of Discovery Inc. with Turner Sports parent company WarnerMedia to form Warner Bros. Discovery. GolfTV had previously attempted to run its own, similar franchise of golf events as part of a content deal with Woods. Ernie Johnson and Charles Barkley served as commentators for the competition.

The Match VII
The seventh edition of The Match was held in prime time on December 10, 2022 at Pelican Golf Club in Belleair, Florida. Tiger Woods, the only returning professional golfer, partnered with Rory McIlroy and competed against Jordan Spieth and Justin Thomas in a four-ball event. In his first televised event since the 2022 Open Championship, and still recovering from injuries sustained in a 2021 car crash, Woods and McIlroy were beaten by Spieth and Thomas 3 and 2 in the 10-hole event.

Results

Notes

References

Golf on television
Golf tournaments in the United States
Turner Sports
2018 American television series debuts
Tiger Woods